The 2021–22 IUPUI Jaguars men's basketball team represented Indiana University–Purdue University Indianapolis in the 2021–22 NCAA Division I men's basketball season. The Jaguars, led by first year head coach Matt Crenshaw, played their home games at Indiana Farmers Coliseum in Indianapolis, Indiana as members of the Horizon League.

Previous season
The Jaguars finished the 2020–21 season 8–10, 7–9 in Horizon League play to finish in seventh place. They lost in the first round of the Horizon League tournament to Milwaukee.

Offseason

Departures

Incoming transfers

Recruiting class

Roster

Schedule and results

|-
!colspan=12 style=| Exhibition

|-
!colspan=9 style=| Regular season

|-
!colspan=9 style=| Horizon League tournament

|-

Source

References

IUPUI Jaguars men's basketball seasons
IUPUI Jaguars
IUPUI Jaguars men's basketball
IUPUI Jaguars men's basketball